Princess Aurora is a 2005 South Korean film about a mother over grieving the death of her child, who goes on a murderous revenge spree. It was the directorial and writing debut of actress-director Bang Eun-jin.

Plot
A strange series of murders begin to take place in Korea. There seems to be no connection between the victims, only a small sticker depicting a character from the popular "Princess Aurora" cartoon series is found at every crime scene.

Detective Oh Sung-ho (Moon Sung-keun), who is studying to become a priest, and his partner (Kwon Oh-joong) are working on the serial murder case, with little progress. Sung-ho begins to suspect that his ex-wife Jung Soon-jung (Uhm Jung-hwa) might be behind the murders. Uncertain of his suspicions, Sung-ho withholds information, and instead of confirming Soon-jung's guilt or innocence, gets caught up emotionally and spends a romantic night with her. The killings continue, with Soon-jung out to punish everyone whom she believes played a role in her young child's death. Soon-jung eventually allows herself to be captured, in order to complete the final act of her revenge.

Cast
Uhm Jung-hwa - Jung Soon-jung 
Moon Sung-keun - Oh Sung-ho 
Kwon Oh-joong - Detective Jung
Choi Jong-won - chief of detective squad 
Hyun Young - Choi Shin-ok 
Kim Yong-gun - Na Jae-keun 
Kim Ik-tae - Park Dal-soo, taxi driver
Park Hyo-jun - Jang Myung-gil
Jang Hyun-sung - Kim Woo-tae
Park Seong-bin - Hong Ki-bum
Lee Ji-soo
Choi Ye-jin
Lee Dae-yeon - chief detective
Park Kwang-jung - coroner
Jung Eun-pyo 
Kim Yeon-jae
Yoo Hye-jung
Jung Man-sik - Detective Choi
Kim Seon-hwa - Jang Myung-gil's mother
Park Byung-eun - Porsche customer 2
Park Hyuk-kwon - squad captain
Lee Jung-yong - Detective Baek
Lee Seol-hee - department store parking attendant
Jung Sung-hwa

Reception
Though it was released with far less fanfare, its violent theme earned it comparison to Sympathy for Lady Vengeance, released the same year.

Awards and nominations
2005 Korean Association of Film Critics Awards
 Best New Director - Bang Eun-jin

2005 Women in Film Korea Awards
 Woman Filmmaker of the Year - Bang Eun-jin

2006 Baeksang Arts Awards
 Nomination - Best Actress - Uhm Jung-hwa
 Nomination - Best New Director - Bang Eun-jin

2006 Golden Cinematography Awards
 Best New Director - Bang Eun-jin

2006 Busan Film Critics Awards
 Best Actress - Uhm Jung-hwa

2006 Korean Film Awards
 Nomination - Best New Director - Bang Eun-jin

References

External links
 
 

2005 films
2005 crime thriller films
South Korean crime thriller films
South Korean serial killer films
Films directed by Bang Eun-jin
CJ Entertainment films
Cinema Service films
2000s Korean-language films
2005 directorial debut films
South Korean films about revenge
2000s South Korean films